The 2009-10 Finland's Women's National Hockey team represented Finland at the 2010 Winter Olympics. Prior to the games, the National team participated in various tournaments during the 2009-10 season. The team won the Bronze Medal at the 2010 Winter Olympics. The head coach is Pekka Hämäläinen.

Schedule

2009 Canada Cup
All games were held at General Motors Place in Vancouver, British Columbia.

2009 4 Nations Cup
All games were held in Finland.

USA Hockey Qwest Tour

Roster

2010 Olympics

In the bronze medal game, Karoliina Rantamäki scored in overtime as Finland beat Sweden 3-2. Heidi Pelttari and Michelle Karvinen also scored for Finland. Noora Rätyä made 16 saves for Finland who led 2-1 after the second period. Rantamäki scored the winner just 2:33 into the overtime.

Player stats

Skaters

Goaltenders

See also
 Finland women's national ice hockey team
 Women's Ice Hockey in Finland
 Finland women's national U-18 ice hockey team

References

Finland
Women's National Ice Hockey Team, 2009-10
Finland women's national ice hockey team
Finland women